The African Union Transition Mission in Somalia (ATMIS) is an active African Union transition and drawdown mission from peacekeeping operations in Somalia. Formerly the African Union Mission to Somalia, ATMIS's mandate will end in 2024, with full transition of security operations to the Somali National Armed Forces. ATMIS consists of troops from the East African nations of Burundi, Djibouti, Ethiopia, Kenya, and Uganda.

Overview 
The African Union Transition Mission in Somalia was formed on 1 April 2022, following the end of the AMISOM mandate on 31 March. The mission is focused on both military and institutional autonomy of the Somali government as the African Union pulls out. The mission's mandate is set to end on 31 December 2024, when Somali Security Forces are expected to fully take over the security responsibilities of the country, guided by the Somalia Transition Plan. The first reduction of troops to ease into the end of the peacekeeping mission will take place in December 2022.

Response from Somalia 
On 6 April 2022, the Prime Minister of Somalia Mohamed Hussein Roble orders African Union Ambassador to Somalia Francisco Madeira persona non grata to leave the country within 48 hours because of "engaging in acts that are incompatible with his status," after audio emerged of him criticizing government officials for not dealing with national security problems. President of Somalia Mohamed Abdullahi Mohamed, a major critic of PM Roble, immediately rejects the expulsion. On 16 April 2022, plans for a new African Union ambassador to come to Somalia to replace Francisco Madeira begin, after the controversy on 6 April that soured relations with the Prime Minister.

Major Incidents and Casualties

2022 
 3 May – Al-Shabaab jihadists armed with guns and explosives stormed an ATMIS base in El Baraf, Middle Shabelle region, triggering a fierce firefight killing 30 soldiers and wounding another 22 Burundian peacekeepers, according to a high-ranking Burundian military officer. A dozen soldiers were also declared missing. This was the first ever attack on ATMIS since taking over AMISOM on 31 March.

See also 
 African Union
 African Union-led Regional Task Force
 Multinational Joint Task Force
 Force Intervention Brigade
 Intergovernmental Authority on Development
 Islamic Courts Union
 Transitional Federal Government
 Somali Civil War (diplomatic and humanitarian efforts)

References 

2022 establishments in Somalia
2020s in Somalia
Foreign relations of Somalia
Government of Somalia
Peacekeeping missions and operations involving the African Union
Somali Civil War (2009–present)